The 1939 Ashton-under-Lyne by-election was a by-election held for the British House of Commons constituency of Ashton-under-Lyne on 28 October 1939.  The seat had become vacant on the death of the Labour Member of Parliament Fred Simpson, who had held the seat since the 1935 general election.

The Labour candidate, William Jowitt, was returned unopposed.  He represented the constituency until he was elevated to the peerage as Earl Jowitt shortly after the 1945 general election.

See also
Ashton-under-Lyne (UK Parliament constituency)
1920 Ashton-under-Lyne by-election
1928 Ashton-under-Lyne by-election
1931 Ashton-under-Lyne by-election
1945 Ashton-under-Lyne by-election
List of United Kingdom by-elections

References 

1939 elections in the United Kingdom
1939 in England
By-elections to the Parliament of the United Kingdom in Greater Manchester constituencies
Unopposed by-elections to the Parliament of the United Kingdom (need citation)
By-elections to the Parliament of the United Kingdom in Lancashire constituencies
Ashton-under-Lyne
Elections in Tameside
1930s in Lancashire
October 1939 events